Oddmund Hagen (born 1950) is a Norwegian poet, novelist, children's writer and literary critic.

He was born in Snillfjord. He made his literary debut in 1977 with the poetry collection Kvardagar. Other collections are Tiltale from 1980, Heller ikkje du from 1992, and Bort, bort frå dette from 1994. In 1989 he wrote the short story collection Å legge til – at alt er borte, and a second collection, Denne brannen, alltid, came in 1995. In 1996 he wrote the novel Utmark, about an outsider who returns home from a journey. His children's books include three picture books about the hare baby "Klumpen", Over jordet from 1998, Rundt jordet from 2000, and Bort frå jordet from 2003 – illustrated by Akin Düzakin.

Awards
 Nynorsk Literature Prize 1996 for Utmark
 Samlagsprisen 1999

See also

 Norwegian literature

References

1950 births
Living people
People from Sør-Trøndelag
20th-century Norwegian poets
20th-century Norwegian novelists
Norwegian children's writers
Norwegian literary critics
Norwegian male poets
Norwegian male novelists
20th-century Norwegian male writers